A b-boy is a person devoted to breaking or break dancing.

B Boy may also refer to:

Music
 "B Boy Baby", a song written by Mutya Buena (2006)
 "B Boy" (song) by Meek Mill (2015)
 B-Boy Park, an annual Japanese hip hop festival
 B-Boy Records, an independent hip hop record label
 B Boys (band), a UK male vocal/instrumental pop group

Other
 Planet B-Boy, a 2007 documentary film
 B-Boy, a video game for PlayStation 2 and PSP
 B-Boy (wrestler), the ring name of Benjamin Cuntapay (born 1978)

See also 
 B-girl (disambiguation)
 Beastie Boys, an American hip hop group